The 2024 United States House of Representatives elections in Arizona will be held on November 5, 2024, to elect the nine U.S. representatives from the State of Arizona, one from all nine of the state's congressional districts. The elections will coincide with the 2024 U.S. presidential election, as well as other elections to the House of Representatives, elections to the United States Senate, and various state and local elections.

District 1

The incumbent is Republican David Schweikert, who was re-elected with 50.4% of the vote in 2022.

Republican primary

Candidates

Potential
David Schweikert, incumbent U.S. Representative

Democratic primary

Candidates

Publicly expressed interest
Marlene Galan Woods, former TV news anchor and widow of former Arizona Attorney General Grant Woods
Jevin Hodge, vice chair of the Arizona Democratic Party and nominee in 2022

General election

Predictions

District 2

The incumbent is Republican Eli Crane, who flipped the district and was elected with 53.9% of the vote in 2022.

Republican primary

Candidates

Potential
Eli Crane, incumbent U.S. Representative

Democratic primary

Candidates

Publicly expressed interest
Jonathan Nez, former president of the Navajo Nation

Potential
Tom O'Halleran, former U.S. Representative for this district (2017–2023)

General election

Predictions

District 3

The 3rd district is majority-Latino and is based in downtown and western Phoenix. The incumbent is Democrat Ruben Gallego, who was re-elected with 77.0% of the vote in 2022. He is not seeking re-election, instead choosing to run for U.S. Senate.

Democratic primary

Candidates

Filed paperwork
Héctor Jaramillo, Glendale school board member

Publicly expressed interest
Yassamin Ansari, Phoenix city councilor
Reginald Bolding, former Minority Leader of the Arizona House of Representatives and candidate for Arizona Secretary of State in 2022
Betty Guardado, Phoenix city councilor
Laura Pastor, Phoenix city councilor and daughter of former U.S. Representative Ed Pastor
Raquel Terán, state senator, former Minority Leader of the Arizona Senate, and former chair of the Arizona Democratic Party

Potential
Cesar Chavez, former state representative
Luis Heredia, state director for U.S. Senator Mark Kelly
Catherine Miranda, state senator and candidate for this district in 2018
Martín Quezada, director of the Arizona Registrar of Contractors, former state senator, and nominee for Arizona State Treasurer in 2022
Analise Ortiz, state representative
Anna Tovar, Arizona Corporation Commissioner

Declined
Steve Gallardo, Maricopa County supervisor and former state senator
Kate Gallego, Mayor of Phoenix (2019–present)
Ruben Gallego, incumbent U.S. Representative (running for U.S. Senate)

General election

Predictions

District 4

The incumbent is Democrat Greg Stanton, who was re-elected with 56.1% of the vote in 2022.

Democratic primary

Candidates

Potential
Greg Stanton, incumbent U.S. Representative

Republican primary

Candidates

Declared
Kelly Cooper, restaurant owner and nominee in 2022

General election

Predictions

District 6

The incumbent is Republican Juan Ciscomani, who flipped the district and was elected with 50.7% of the vote in 2022.

Republican primary

Candidates

Potential
Juan Ciscomani, incumbent U.S. Representative

Democratic primary

Candidates

Potential
Kirsten Engel, former state senator and nominee in 2022

General election

Predictions

Notes

References

2024
Arizona
United States House of Representatives